Edmund Carl Kornfeld (24 February 1919 – 22 June 2012) was an American organic chemist who devoted his life to the research of new drugs. His leading discovery, with the help of a team, was an antibiotic that was later named vancomycin.

Early life and education 
Edmund Carl Kornfeld was born on February 24, 1919, in Philadelphia, Pennsylvania, to Elsie and Julius Kornfeld. He received his AB from Temple University in 1940 and his PhD in chemistry from Harvard University in 1944.

Career 
In 1946, he joined Eli Lilly and Company in Indianapolis, Indiana, where most of his discoveries took place. Kornfeld and his team discovered a microbe, Streptomyces orientalis, which was found in soil samples from Borneo. In 1953, they discovered that this microbe produced a unique compound which had the remarkable property of killing all staphylococcal bacteria, including the penicillin-resistant strains. The drug’s ability to inhibit staphylococci was stable during early assays, suggesting that it might be clinically useful for a long period.

One of the most difficult tasks that Kornfeld and his team faced was purifying the new compound. The purification method employed during that time utilised picric acid - a potentially explosive chemical; because of this an alternate process was developed. However, this new method yielded material with a purity of only 82% and when solubilized, produced a brown liquid aptly termed “Mississippi mud”. However, due to the need for an alternative to penicillin in resistant bacterial infections, the initial preparations were considered safe enough for use in humans.

The drug was given to a patient who had developed a severe infection on his foot after surgery which was unresponsive to multiple antibiotics. The surgical staff recommended amputation or the usage of the new antibiotic. His answer was ‘ Anything that might save my foot’. Due to the spread of the bacteria, a high dosage the antibiotic of 05865 was recommended, 100 mg every eight hours, over five days. After the first day, the heat was decreasing, his white cell count was dropping and the exudate of his wound was less. During the next seven days, the staphylococci disappeared from the wound, and his foot was free from any sign of infection. Two months later he left the hospital with an intact foot.

The new antibiotic was named vancomycin, from the term "vanquish" and was approved by the U.S. Food and Drug Administration in 1958.

In 1956 with help from Robert Burns Woodward, Kornfeld was successful in synthesizing the first lab produced lysergic acid (LSD). Eli Lilly was looking for a treatment for anxiety, depression, psychosomatic diseases and addiction.

Kornfeld's research also resulted in the discovery of pergolide as a medication for Parkinson's disease.

Published books
Condensation of heterocyclic bases with acetylene dicarboxylic ester. 
Publisher: Harvard University, 1945.

The Total Synthesis of Lysergic Acid.
Edmund C. Kornfeld, E. J. Fornefeld, G. Bruce Kline, Marjorie J. Mann, Dwight E. Morrison, Reuben G. Jones, R. B. Woodward.

References

External links
L. Esposito, Anthony. "That Which Endures: The Quiet Heroes of Medical Discovery." www.wdms.org. Version Volume 75. Anthony L. Esposito, MD, FACP, 1 June 2011. Web. 22 Nov. 2011. http://www.wdms.org/html/womed_jul-aug11/womed_jul-aug11.pdf
Spink LW. Clinical and biologic significance of penicillin resistant staphylococci, including observations with streptomycin, aureomycin, chloramphenicol and terramycin. J Lab Clin Med 1951;37:278-93.
Cooper GL and Given DB. Vancomycin: A comprehensive review of 30 years of clinical experience. New York, NY, Park Row Publishers, Inc., 1986.
"The journal of organic chemistry." pubs.acs.org. N.p., n.d. Web. 25 Nov. 2011. http://pubs.acs.org/toc/joceah/16/1
Dr Edmund Carl Kornfeld memorial at Find A Grave https://www.findagrave.com/memorial/92929749
Dr Edmund Carl Kornfeld memorial at Harry W. Moore Funeral Home https://archive.today/20130125062843/http://www.harrywmoore.com/book-of-memories/1248875/Kornfeld-Edmund/service-details.php

American chemists
1919 births
Organic chemists
2012 deaths
Temple University alumni
Harvard University alumni
Eli Lilly and Company people